Pictures of the Old World is a 1972 Slovak documentary film by Dušan Hanák. The film is about old people who seemingly live at the edge of society. Pictures of the Old World was voted in 2000 by Slovak critics as the best Slovak film of all time. The film won the Best Non-Fiction Film at 1990 Los Angeles Film Critics Association Awards. The film was banned until 1988 and so it is officially premiered in July 1988.

Characteristics
The film consists of dialogues with old people who haven't been "deformed by civilisation." The film tries to find answers to questions of human existence. People featured in the film tell their life stories that are linked to their ancestors' customs. Their lives are often sad and unhappy. The most of them live the remainder of their lives lonely with animals as their only friends.

See also
 List of films considered the best

External links

References

1972 documentary films
1972 films
Documentary films about old age
Slovak-language films
Films directed by Dušan Hanák
Czechoslovak documentary films
Slovak documentary films